The Journal of Porphyrins and Phthalocyanines (JPP) was founded in 1997 and is published by World Scientific. It covers "research in the chemistry, physics, biology and technology of porphyrins, phthalocyanines and related macrocycles". The journal also deals with the synthesis, spectroscopy, processing and applications of such compounds. According to the Journal Citation Reports, the journal has a 2019 impact factor of 1.816, ranking it 83rd out of 157 journals in the category "Chemistry Multidisciplinary".

About JPP, SPP and ICPP 
The Journal of Porphyrins and Phthalocyanines (JPP) covers the recent research works that happen in the area of porphyrins, phthalocyanines and related macrocycles. Research articles, reviews and communications that dealing with the synthesis, spectroscopy, processing and applications of these compounds. The Society of Porphyrins & Phthalocyanines (SPP) formed in June 2000, by a group of scientists who are working in the area of porphyrins phthalocyanines & related macrocycles in any scientific discipline. SPP purchased the Journal of Porphyrins and Phthalocyanines (JPP) from John Wiley & Sons at the end of 2001 and for the next seven years handled all aspects of its publication out of the Dijon office. SPP organises biennial conference named International Conference on Porphyrins and Phthalocyanines (ICPP) in various part of the world.

References

External links 
 JPP Journal Website

World Scientific academic journals
Chemistry journals
Publications established in 1997
English-language journals